Illinois Business Consulting (IBC) is the largest student-run management consulting organization in the United States. It was founded in 1996 by Dr. Paul Magelli at the University of Illinois at Urbana–Champaign. Since then, the organization has completed 750 projects for over 500 clients worldwide.

Structure
Currently, IBC is a nonprofit organization operating within the College of Business at the University of Illinois at Urbana–Champaign. As of 2013, IBC conducts between 60 and 70 annual projects for companies including Fortune 500 companies and start‐up companies (profits and non-profits). It also offers language skills capabilities, especially for the emerging markets of India and China. The organization aims to allow students to apply knowledge they have learned in the classroom to real life business situations. IBC hires both undergraduate and graduate students of all academic majors to create diversified project teams and promote cross-functionality. University faculty and a professional staff with consulting experience to provide guidance to about 200 graduate and undergraduate students.

Past projects

University of Illinois Aviation Department
In September 2010, the Stewarding Excellence program at Illinois proposed to close the Institute of Aviation to save a potential $500,000 to $750,000. The university asked IBC to evaluate the attractiveness of a self-supporting, non-degree certification program as an alternative. IBC was instrumental in determining that with declining enrollment rates and flight fees of approximately $32,000, there would not be enough student support for a non-degree aviation certification program.

Cozad Assessment Management
Cozad Assessment Management, Inc. is an Illinois-based company providing financial services and advice. The company manages an investment portfolio called the International Equity Income (IEI) Separate Managed Accounts Composite, which in 2010 had a return nearly four times higher than the yearly average. Cozad attributed the success to the deliverables presented by an IBC team. Their task was to analyze and report on performance data from 65 countries. Students on the team investigated the risks and returns of international investing and conducted complex macroeconomic analysis.

University of Illinois Employee Credit Union
The University of Illinois Employees Credit Union (UIECU) is a non-profit credit union based in Champaign, Illinois, founded in 1936. The UIECU approached IBC to provide a strategy plan for future growth in Champaign County, improve their brand positioning and develop better products for their members. After a year-long study, IBC provided a new business plan, ideas for market segmentation of current members, and projection for expansion of the product portfolio.

References

External links
Illinois Business Consulting
University of Illinois College of Business
University of Illinois at Urbana-Champaign

Management consulting firms
Student organizations in the United States
University of Illinois Urbana-Champaign
1996 establishments in the United States
1996 establishments in Illinois
Organizations established in 1996
University of Illinois Urbana-Champaign student organizations